Levi Johnson (born October 30, 1950)  is a former American football cornerback who played five seasons for the Detroit Lions in the National Football League. He had 21 interceptions in less than five years as an NFL player, returning three for touchdowns.

Johnson led the Lions with five interceptions during the 1973 NFL season and the 1974 NFL season, returning two for touchdowns in 1974, including one on Thanksgiving Day against the Denver Broncos.

He added another touchdown during the 1975 NFL season against the Green Bay Packers. During the season-opener, he blocked two punts and fell on one in the end zone for the score. Teammate Larry Ball picked up Johnson's other blocked punt and returned it 34 yards for another touchdown.

Johnson had a career-high six interceptions in 1976, and was second on the team that season, one behind James Hunter. He also scored the final touchdown of his career, picking off Jim Zorn of the expansion Seattle Seahawks and returning it 70 yards for the score.

Johnson had two interceptions in the 1977 NFL season's third game, against the Philadelphia Eagles, but sustained a knee injury and never played again in the NFL.

References

1950 births
Living people
American football defensive backs
Texas A&M–Kingsville Javelinas football players
Detroit Lions players
People from Corpus Christi, Texas